Tunepics is a social networking service that lets the users share their own photos combined with a suitable soundtrack. The user chooses a photo to upload, and has a range of filters and other tools to choose from to edit the photo. Thereafter the user has the possibility to choose a soundtrack that gets played when the photo is shown. The purpose of combining the photos with music is to let the sound and image complement each other, to bring out something new from the photo and make it possible for the users to express themselves in a different way than in other social network applications. The music available comes from the Apple store and is an about 30 seconds long preview of the track.

When the photo is shared on Tunepics other users are able to like, retune (share), comment and spin the emotion wheel to select the emotion they think the photo is expressing. The emotion wheel consists of 16 rainbow-colored dots that represent the emotions love, hot, laughing, happy, moved, excited, jealous, singing, inspired, crying, dreaming, cool, sad, beautiful, dancing and heartbroken. These reactions from other users are shown as a kind of feedback on what they experienced from the uploaded picture and soundtrack.

History 
The iOS application was created in 2014 by London-based Justin Cooke, the founder of innovation agency innovate7, who earlier worked as the marketing chief of Topshop and as a vice president of Burberry.

Tools 
Like in many other social network sites Tunepics uses hashtags to help make the spreading of the photos wider. The users are also able to tag other users in their uploads, as well as tag where the photo was taken. If people like a soundtrack to an image they can push the button "buy on iTunes" and get redirected to the iTunes store.

The photo-editing options in Tunepics are a brightness and contrast-adjustor, ten different filters, four different pattern-filters and a crop/tilt-adjustor.

See also 
 Instagram
 Facebook
 Twitter
 Vine

References 
1. Sedghi, A. (2014). Tunepics: the photo app that lets you add mood music from iTunes. The Guardian. Received from https://www.theguardian.com/technology/2014/may/22/tunepics-instagram-app-justin-cooke-topshop-burberry

2. Butcher, M. (2014). New Tunepics social network is like Instagram with a soundtrack. TechCrunch. Received from https://techcrunch.com/2014/05/21/new-tunepics-social-network-is-like-instagram-with-a-soundtrack/

External links 
 Official  website

British social networking websites